S&M (an abbreviation of Symphony and Metallica) is a live album by American heavy metal band Metallica, with the San Francisco Symphony conducted by Michael Kamen. It was recorded on April 21 and 22, 1999, at The Berkeley Community Theatre. This is the final Metallica album to feature bassist Jason Newsted.

Album information
S&M contains performances of Metallica songs with additional symphonic accompaniment, composed by Michael Kamen, who also conducted the orchestra during the concert.  According to James Hetfield, the idea to combine heavy metal with an epic classical approach was Cliff Burton's idea. His love of classical music, especially of Johann Sebastian Bach, can be found in many instrumental parts and melodic characteristics in Metallica's songwriting, including songs from Ride The Lightning and Master of Puppets. Kamen, who arranged and conducted the orchestral background tracks for "Nothing Else Matters", met the band at the 1992 Grammy award show for the first time, and after hearing the "Elevator version" of the song, suggested the band perform with a whole orchestra; the band, however, did not take him up on the offer until seven years later. Lars Ulrich's favorite band Deep Purple, whom he colorfully inducted into the Rock and Roll Hall of Fame in 2016, is noted for having kicked off this kind of approach 30 years before, in Concerto for Group and Orchestra (1969), although it had actually been done multiple times before, most notably with the Moody Blues' Days of Future Passed in 1967.

In addition to songs from previous albums spanning Ride the Lightning through Reload, there are two new compositions: "No Leaf Clover" and "−Human". "The Ecstasy of Gold" by Ennio Morricone, Metallica's entrance music, was played live by the orchestra. "No Leaf Clover" has since been performed by Metallica in concert, using a recording of the orchestral prelude.

Changes were made to the lyrics of some songs, most notably the removal of the second verse and chorus of "The Thing That Should Not Be" and playing the third verse in its place.

The "S" in the stylized "S&M" on the album cover is a backwards treble clef, while the "M" is taken from Metallica's logo.

The drum kit Ulrich used on the album currently resides in a Guitar Center in San Francisco.

Critical reception

Rolling Stone (January 20, 2000, pp. 57–59) - 3 stars out of 5 - "...create the most crowded, ceiling-rattling basement rec room in rock....[in its] sheer awesomeness...the live performance succeeded....the monster numbers benefit from supersizing. The effect is more one of timelessness..."
Spin (February 2000, pp. 114–5) – 8 out of 10 – "...makes their tempo and texture dynamics...into a topic in and off of itself, a deep evocation of bad-voodoo creeping willies culminating in 'One' and 'Enter Sandman'....Freed from ritualized superhuman extremism, it builds a soundtrack to everyday life."
Entertainment Weekly (December 3, 1999, p. 102) – "Buttressed by grim strings, creaky horns, and thundering timpani, staples...creep with fearful new dimension, like an old Posada print come to life." – Rating: B
Q (February 2000, p. 86) – 3 stars out of 5 – "...another just about forgivable flirtation with Spinal Tap-esque lunacy....a fine hit-heavy live LP with bolted-on bombast from the S.F. Symphony....Michael Kamen's scores swoop and soar with impressive portent throughout."
CMJ (December 20, 1999, p. 24) – "...stunning....orchestral renditions of hits from the band's '90s output."
S&M was included in the book 1001 Albums You Must Hear Before You Die.
NME ranked the album 48th on its list of 50 Greatest Live Albums.
Metal Hammer magazine named it one of the 20 best metal albums of 1999.

Accolades

Commercial performance
S&M sold 300,000 units in the first week of release, and went on to sell a total of 2.5 million copies. As of 2003, the album had been certified 5× platinum. As of August 2013 the album had sold more than 8 million copies worldwide.

20th anniversary

After Kamen's death in 2003, Metallica did not revisit the S&M concept in any further performances or recording work for years. However, the band announced on March 18, 2019, that they would hold a concert with the San Francisco Symphony at the Chase Center on September 6 of that year to commemorate the 20th anniversary with a single-night concert, headed by Michael Tilson Thomas as music director. They later added a second concert on September 8.

The shows included many songs from the original S&M performances, as well as renditions of songs that had been released since then. In August, it was announced that a film of the concerts would receive a limited worldwide theatrical release. The concert was given a limited release and has grossed over 5.5 million dollars. In August 2020, the band released the two 20th anniversary performances as an album, video, and box set entitled S&M2.

Track listing

Video release
Metallica also filmed and released the concert in DVD and VHS with direction by Wayne Isham. The VHS set has only the concert video, while the double DVD set has 5.1 sound (also: 2.0 band+orchestra, 2.0 band-only and 2.0 orchestra-only), 41 minute documentary about the concert, and two "No Leaf Clover" music videos: "Slice & Dice" version and the "Maestro Edit". The DVD also contains four songs with multi-angles where each band member can be viewed individually: "Of Wolf and Man", "Fuel", "Sad But True", and "Enter Sandman".

Personnel

Metallica
 James Hetfield – lead vocals, rhythm guitar, electro-acoustic guitar in "Nothing Else Matters"; solo in "Master of Puppets" and "Nothing Else Matters", outro solo in "The Outlaw Torn" 
 Kirk Hammett – lead guitar, backing vocals, sitar on "Wherever I May Roam"
 Jason Newsted – bass guitar, backing vocals
 Lars Ulrich – drums

Video production
 Wayne Isham – video director
 Bart Lipton – video producer
 Dana Marshall – video producer

San Francisco Symphony

 Michael Kamen – conductor
 John Kieser – general manager
 Eric Achen, Joshua Garrett, Douglas Hull, Jonathan Ring, Bruce Roberts, Robert Ward, James Smelser – French horns
 David Teie principal, Richard Andaya, Barara Bogatin, Jill Rachuy Brindel, David Goldblatt – cello
 Jeremy Constant concertmaster, Daniel Banner, Enrique Bocedi, Paul Brancato, Catherine Down, Bruce Freifeld, Connie Gantsweg, Michael Gerling, Frances Jeffrey, Robert Zelnick, Yukiko Kamei, Naomi Kazama, Kum Mo Kim, Yasuko Hattori, Melissa Kleinbart, Mo Kobialka, Daniel Kobialka, Rudolph Kremer, Kelly Leon-Pearce, Diane Nicholeris, Florin Parvulescu, Anne Pinsker, Victor Romasevich, Philip Santos, Peter Shelton – violins
 Chris Bogios, Glenn Fischthal, Andrew McCandless, Craig Morris – trumpets
 Stephen Paulson, Steven Dibner, Rob Weir – bassoons
 Steven Braunstein – contrabassoon
 Charles Chandler, Laurence Epstein, Chris Gilbert, William Ritchen, Stephen Tramontozzi, S. Mark Wright – double basses
 Anthony J. Cirone, Ray Froelich, Thomas Hemphill, Artie Storch – percussion
 Don Ehrlich, Gina Feinauer, David Gaudry, Christina King, Yun Jie Liu, Seth Mausner, Nanci Severance, Geraldine Walther – violas
 John Engelkes, Tom Hornig, Paul Welcomer, Jeff Budin – trombones
 Julie Ann Giacobassi, Eugene Izotov, Pamela Smith – oboes
 Russ deLuna – English horn
 David Herbert – timpani
 Linda Lukas, Tim Day, Robin McKee – flutes
 David Neuman, Carey Bell, Luis Beez – clarinets
 Catherine Payne – piccolo
 Douglas Rioth – harp
 Robin Sutherland – keyboards
 Peter Wahrhaftig – tuba

Technical personnel

 Bob Rock – producer, engineer
James Hetfield – producer
Lars Ulrich – producer
Michael Kamen – producer, orchestration, arranger, liner notes, music director
 Randy Staub – engineer, mixing
Steve McLaughlin – engineer, recording
 George Marino – mastering
 Billy Bowers – digital editing
Paul DeCarli – digital editing
Mike Gillies – digital editing
Darren Grahn – digital editing, assistant
 John Vrtacic – technical assistance
 James Brett – assistant, music preparation
Billy Konkel – assistant
Leff Lefferts – assistant
Kent Matcke – assistant
 Geoffrey Alexander – orchestration
 Ted Allen – orchestration
Pete Anthony – orchestration
Chris Wagner – orchestration
Bruce Babcock - orchestration
Chris Boardman – orchestration
Bob Elhai – orchestration
Blake Neely – orchestration, music copyist, music preparation
Jonathan Sacks – orchestration
Brad Warnaar – orchestration
Michael Price – music preparation
 Vic Fraser – music copyist
 Andie Airfix – design
 Anton Corbijn – photography

Chart positions

Weekly charts

Year-end charts

Singles

Certifications and sales

References

Albums produced by Bob Rock
Metallica video albums
1999 live albums
Metallica live albums
1999 video albums
Elektra Records live albums
Elektra Records video albums
Collaborative albums
Vertigo Records live albums
Vertigo Records video albums
Live symphonic metal albums
Albums produced by Michael Kamen
San Francisco Symphony albums
Symphonic metal video albums